Collevecchio is a  (municipality) in the province of Rieti in the Italian region of Latium.

Territory
Collevecchio borders the following Comuni: Civita Castellana, Magliano Sabina, Montebuono, Ponzano Romano, Stimigliano, Tarano. The frazione of Poggio Sommavilla is home to an prehistoric and arcaico archaeological site on Tibervalley with center acropolis and a necropolis.

The economy is based on agriculture (olive, wine) and animal husbandry (cattle and goats).

References

External links
 Istituto per l'Archeologia Etrusco-Italica  Museum Civico of Magliano Sabina, exhibit the reperts of necropolis  of Poggio Sommavilla (Collevecchio).

Cities and towns in Lazio
Archaeological sites in Italy